The 1968 European Indoor Games were held between 9–10 March 1968 at Palacio de Deportes, Madrid, the capital of Spain.

The track used for the championships was 182 metres long.

Medal summary

Men

Women

Medal table

Participating nations

 (5)
 (16)
 (2)
 (15)
 (12)
 (7)
 (2)
 (1)
 (8)
 (5)
 (12)
 (3)
 (6)
 (41)
 (16)
 (7)
 (6)
 (2)
 (28)
 (11)

References
 Results
 Medallists – men at GBRathletics.com
 Medallists – women at GBRathletics.com

 
European Athletics Indoor Championships
European Indoor Games
Sports competitions in Madrid
International athletics competitions hosted by Spain
Athletics European Indoor
1960s in Madrid
European Indoor Games